Sheykh Saluy-e Sofla (also Romanized as Sheykh Salūy-e Soflá and Sheikh Salooy Sofla; also known as Shaikh Silu Ashāghi, Sheykh Salū-ye Pā”īn, Sheykh Salū-ye Soflá, Sheykh Selū-ye Pā'īn, Sheykh Solū, Sheykh Solū-ye Pā”īn, and Sheykh Solū-ye Soflá) is a village in Chaldoran-e Jonubi Rural District, in the Central District of Chaldoran County, West Azerbaijan Province, Iran. At the 2006 census, its population was 387, in 69 families.

References 

Populated places in Chaldoran County